Lederer is a surname of German origin, meaning "leatherworker". Notable people with the surname include:

 Ábrahám Lederer (18271916), Czech-Hungarian educator and writer
 Andrew J. Lederer (born before 1988), American comedian
 Eppie Lederer (AKA Esther "Eppie" Pauline Friedman-Lederer AKA Ann Landers, 19182002), American advice columnist
 Charles Lederer (191076), American film writer and director
 Charles Lederer (cartoonist) (18561925), American cartoonist
 Edith Lederer (born 1943), American journalist
 Emil Lederer (18821939), German economist
 Ephraim Lederer (1862–1925), American lawyer
 Felix Lederer (18771957), Czech musician and conductor
 Francis Lederer (18992000), Czech actor
 Franz Lederer (football manager) (born 1963), Austrian football manager
 George Lederer (1938), American producer and director on Broadway
 Gordan Lederer (195891), Croatian photographer and cameraman
 Gretchen Lederer (18911955), German movie actress of the silent era
 Helen Lederer (born 1954), English comedian, writer and actress
 Howard Lederer (born 1963), U.S. professional poker player
 Hugo Lederer (18711940), German sculptor
 Ivo John Lederer (192998), Croatian-born American diplomatic historian
 Jerome F. Lederer (19022004), U.S. aviation safety pioneer
 John Lederer (1644after 1672), German-born doctor and explorer of the Appalachian Mountains
 Julius Lederer (entomologist) (182170), Austrian entomologist
 Julius Lederer (businessman) (191799), American business executive and innovator
 Katy Lederer (born before 1998), U.S. author and poet
 Klaus Lederer (born 1974), German politician
 Laura Lederer (born 1951), U.S. government official and anti-trafficking activist
 Marie Lederer (born 1927), onetime member of the Pennsylvania House of Representatives
 Mark Lederer (born 1976), New England plumber/gas fitter expert and consultant
 Michael Lederer (born 1956), American novelist, short story writer, poet and playwright
 Miles W. Lederer (1897 – 1953), American politician
 Oliver Lederer (born 1978), Austrian footballer and coach
 Otto Lederer (18861965), Austro-Hungary-born American film actor
 Paul Lederer (born before 2004), Hungarian-born Australian businessman and association football team owner
 Pepi Lederer (191035), U.S. actress
 Raymond F. Lederer (19382008), U.S. Congressman from Pennsylvania's 3rd district
 Remo Lederer (born 1968), German ski jumper
 Richard Lederer (born 1938), American author, speaker, and teacher
 Richard Lederer (musician) (born 1971), Austrian metal musician
 Serena Lederer (18671943), Hungarian art collector and friend of Gustav Klimt
 William Lederer (19122009), U.S. naval commander and author
 William J. Lederer (Pennsylvania politician) (19242008), onetime member of the Pennsylvania House of Representatives

See also 
 

German-language surnames
Jewish surnames